Henrik Markus Rödl (born 4 March 1969) is a German professional basketball coach and former player, who currently serves as head coach for Al Ittihad Alexandria of the Egyptian Basketball Super League (EBSL). He played college basketball in the US for coach Dean Smith at the University of North Carolina. Born in Offenbach am Main, Hesse, he has been credited for his role in bringing other European players, including fellow German Ademola Okulaja, into the North Carolina basketball program.

A 2.01 m  (6' 7") shooting guard/small forward, Rödl had great success and a number of championships over a long career in American collegiate and international professional basketball.

Amateur career 
Rödl was spotted by Smith's staff while he was an exchange student at Chapel Hill High School, a school located only a few miles from UNC's campus. Rödl and teammate Major Geer led the CHHS basketball team to the 1987 North Carolina State High School Basketball Championship. He returned to Germany for 2 years before returning to Chapel Hill.

Rödl played for the Tar Heels from 1989 to 1993. Rödl's Tar Heels won the 1993 NCAA Men's Division I Basketball Tournament, making Rödl the third German to win an NCAA Title. He wore jersey #5 during his collegiate career. During his time at North Carolina Rödl  averaged 3.4 points, 1.3 rebounds and 2.2 assists per game.

Professional career 
Rödl played professionally for ALBA Berlin for 11 years.  His team won the 1995 Korać Cup, a former European international pro basketball tournament, and began building a German basketball dynasty. Rödl's ALBA Berlin teams won seven consecutive championships in the Bundesliga from 1997 through 2003. His jersey  number 4 was retired by ALBA Berlin in 2010.

International career 
Rödl also played for many years for the German national basketball team. Rödl played on the team that competed at the 1992 Summer Olympics and led the German team to the European Basketball Championship in 1993. He also played on the team that won the bronze medal at the 2002 FIBA World Championship. Rödl also played for the German team in the 1995, 1997 and 1999 European championship tournaments. He won a total of 178 caps for the German men's national team.

Coaching career 
Rödl started his coaching career in the youth ranks of ALBA Berlin, before being named ALBA head coach in January 2005. He was released in June 2007, but stayed on with the club serving as director of the youth program and coach of the development squad. In 2010, he became head coach of TBB Trier. He left his job there 2015.

Already in May 2014, Rödl had been named head coach of the German A2 men's national team. In 2015, he coached the team to a silver medal at the World University Games. In January 2016, Rödl signed a deal as full-time coach of the German Basketball Federation, continuing as head coach of the A2 squad and serving as assistant to Chris Fleming with the men's national team. Rödl took over the head coaching job on 18 September 2017.

On 14 December 2021, he has signed with Türk Telekom of the Basketball Super League.

In October 2022, Rödl signed as the head coach of Al ittihad Alexandria in Egypt.

References 

1969 births
Living people
1994 FIBA World Championship players
2002 FIBA World Championship players
Alba Berlin basketball coaches
Alba Berlin players
Basketball players at the 1992 Summer Olympics
Basketbol Süper Ligi head coaches
Chapel Hill High School (Chapel Hill, North Carolina) alumni
FIBA EuroBasket-winning players
German basketball coaches
German men's basketball players
German Olympic coaches
German expatriate basketball people in the United States
North Carolina Tar Heels men's basketball players
Olympic basketball players of Germany
Sportspeople from Offenbach am Main
Shooting guards
Small forwards
Türk Telekom basketball coaches
Al Ittihad Alexandria Club basketball coaches